The Lehigh Valley Phantoms are a professional ice hockey team based in Allentown, Pennsylvania. They are members of the East Division of the American Hockey League's (AHL) Eastern Conference. They have been the primary minor league affiliate of the Philadelphia Flyers of the National Hockey League (NHL) since their inception. The Phantoms were founded as the Philadelphia Phantoms in 1996 and primarily played their home games at the Spectrum in Philadelphia, Pennsylvania through the 2008–09 season. They moved to Glens Falls, New York and became the Adirondack Phantoms, playing the next five seasons at the Glens Falls Civic Center. Beginning with the 2014–15 season, the Phantoms moved to Allentown to become the Lehigh Valley Phantoms and currently play at the PPL Center.

As of the completion of the 2020–21 AHL season, 18 goaltenders and 127 skaters (forwards and defensemen) have appeared in at least one regular season and/or playoff game with the Lehigh Valley Phantoms since the team moved to Allentown. The 145 all-time members of the Lehigh Valley Phantoms are listed below, with statistics complete through the end of the 2020–21 season.

Key

 Appeared in a Phantoms game during the most recently completed season

Statistics are complete to the end of the 2020–21 AHL season.

Goaltenders

Goaltenders who played for the team

Skaters

Skaters who played for the team in previous seasons

Skaters who played for the team during the most recently completed season

See also
List of Philadelphia Phantoms players
List of Adirondack Phantoms players

Notes

  The nationality column lists the player's national team or country of birth if the player has never competed internationally. The player's national team is listed if it differs from their country of birth. For example, Rob Zepp was born in Canada but has played for Germany internationally. His nationality is listed as Germany.
 The seasons column lists the first year of the season of the player's first game and the last year of the season of the player's last game. For example, a player who played one game in the 2014–15 season would be listed as playing with the team from 2014–2015, regardless of what calendar year the game occurred within.''

References

General
 
Specific

Lehigh Valley Phantoms
Lehigh Valley Phantoms